The Radio Suisse Romande (RSR) was an enterprise unit within public-broadcasting corporation SRG SSR. It is responsible for the production and transmission of French-language radio programmes in Switzerland. RSR's headquarters are situated in Lausanne. Radio Suisse Romande and Télévision Suisse Romande merged in 2010 to create Radio Télévision Suisse.

Broadcasting
RSR broadcasts on four radio channels:
 La 1ère – news, talk, and general programming
 Espace 2 – culture and classical music
 Couleur 3 – youth-oriented programming
 Option Musique – music ("the hits of yesterday and today")

These channels are broadcast on FM as well as via Digital Audio Broadcasting and satellite (DVB-S). Up until 5 December 2010, Option Musique was also available on AM at 765 kHz from the Sottens transmitter.

External links

 RSR's listeners' website

French-language mass media in Switzerland
Radio in Switzerland
Swiss Broadcasting Corporation